An antithrombotic agent is a drug that reduces the formation of blood clots (thrombi). Antithrombotics can be used therapeutically for prevention (primary prevention, secondary prevention) or treatment of a dangerous blood clot (acute thrombus). In the U.S., the American College of Chest Physicians publishes clinical guidelines for clinicians for the use of these drugs to treat and prevent a variety of diseases.

Processes
Different antithrombotics affect different blood clotting processes:
 Antiplatelet drugs limit the migration or aggregation of platelets.
 Anticoagulants limit the ability of the blood to clot.
 Thrombolytic drugs act to dissolve clots after they have formed.

See also
 Direct Xa inhibitor
 Warfarin

References

External links 
 Antithrombotic Therapy /  American Society of Hematology

Antithrombotic agents